Emery County School District, also known as the Emery School District, is a school district headquartered in Huntington, Utah.

Its boundary is parallel with that of Emery County.

History

Dennis Nelson served as superintendent until 1987, when he stated he would retire from the position.

In May 2021 the board of trustees decided that Jason Strate be the superintendent. In June 2021 the board decided that Ryan Maughan will be the new superintendent.

Schools
 High schools
 Emery High School
 In previous eras it was common for people visiting the school and students to have firearms within their vehicles due to the firearm-centric culture of Emery County. By 1999 the district made plans to stop this practice in wake of Utah state laws prohibiting the practice.
 Green River High School

 Middle schools
 Canyon View Middle School
 San Rafael Middle School

 Elementary schools
 Book Cliff Elementary School
 Castle Dale Elementary School
 Cleveland Elementary School
 Cottonwood Elementary School
 It opened in 1967 and was a continuation of the former Orangeville Elementary School.
 Ferron Elementary School
 Huntington Elementary School

References

External links
 Emery County School District
School districts in Utah
Emery County, Utah